North Wales is an electoral region of the Senedd, consisting of nine constituencies. The region elects thirteen members, nine directly elected constituency members and four additional members. The electoral region was first used in the 1999 Welsh Assembly election, when the National Assembly for Wales was created.

Each constituency elects one Member of the Senedd by the first past the post electoral system, and the region as a whole elects four additional or top-up Members of the Senedd, to create a degree of proportional representation. The additional member seats are allocated from closed lists by the D'Hondt method, with constituency results being taken into account in the allocation.

County and Westminster boundaries

As created in 1999, the region covered the most of the preserved county of Clwyd, part of the preserved county of Gwynedd, and part of the preserved county of Powys. Other parts of these preserved counties were within the Mid and West Wales electoral region. For the 2007 Welsh Assembly election, however, boundaries changed, and the region now covers all of the preserved county of Clwyd and part of the preserved county of Gwynedd. The rest of Gwynedd is in the Mid and West Wales region.

The Senedd constituencies have the names of constituencies of the House of Commons of the Parliament of the United Kingdom (Westminster). For Westminster election purposes, however, there are no electoral regions, and constituency boundary changes became effective for the 2010 United Kingdom general election.

Electoral region profile
The region is a mix of rural and urban areas, with the population higher in the east, where can be found the region's largest town, Wrexham, and the working-class conurbations of Deeside. The western areas, including the Isle of Anglesey (Ynys Môn), are largely rural. Although Anglesey and Gwynedd are home to large numbers of Welsh speakers, the language is not widely spoken in the north-east.

Constituencies

Assembly members and Members of the Senedd

Constituency AMs and MSs

Regional list AMs and MSs

N.B. This table is for presentation purposes only

2021 Senedd election

2021 Senedd election additional members

(The fourth regional seat was allocated to the Conservatives rather than to Plaid Cymru by a margin of only 21 votes).

Regional MSs elected in 2021

2016 Welsh Assembly election additional members

Regional AMs elected in 2016

2011 Welsh Assembly election additional members

Regional AMs elected 2011

† Resigned as AM following her election to the UK House of Commons on 7 May 2015; replaced by Janet Haworth from 27 May 2015.

2007 Welsh Assembly election additional members

2003 Welsh Assembly election additional members

Former constituencies

1999 to 2007

1999 Welsh Assembly election additional members

Notes

References

Senedd electoral regions
North Wales